= Cricketers Club of London =

Cricket Club

The Cricketers Club of London was a private members club run by cricket enthusiasts, at 71 Blandford Street, London, England; the club offered members food and wine, entertainment, visiting speakers and excursions latterly under the management of Grahame McCaffrey.

London Cricket dates back to at least 1856 when it was listed in the city's first directory. Over the years the club has had many homes, including Tecumseh Park, Fanshawe Park, the London Psychiatric Hospital grounds, Maitland Park, and most recently the North London Athletic Fields.With the relaxation of the licensing laws, like many similar clubs in London, it ceased to exist, but Ben Bickley, an old boy of Christ's Hospital, continues to run the Club as a Cricket Club, under the presidency of the famous MCC member John Fingleton and assisted by a number of cricketers who do not believe league cricket to be the end all of cricket. It has a dozen or so fixtures a year.
